The Flores long-nosed rat (Paulamys naso), also known as Paula's long-nosed rat,  is a species of rodent endemic to Flores Island, Indonesia. This species was first described from subfossil fragments collected  in the 1950s by Theodor Verhoeven, who named it Paula's long-nosed rat, and was named Floresomys naso by Guy Musser in 1981. Since Floresomys was preoccupied, Musser changed the name to Paulamys, after Verhoeven's life partner Paula Hamerlinck. A living specimen was reported from the montane forest of western Flores in 1989. It is recorded as common between 1,000 and 2,000 m above sea level on the volcanic mountain Gunung Ranakah, but is believed to be threatened by habitat destruction. It is the only known member of the genus Paulamys .  The genera Papagomys, Komodomys and Paulamys are closer related to each other than to other murids, suggesting an adaptive radiation.

References 

Old World rats and mice
Mammals of Indonesia
Mammals described in 1981
Rodents of Flores